Chichli Khurd is a village in Punasa Tehsil, East Nimar district, Madhya Pradesh. Its population was 1,095 as per population census 2011.

References

Villages in Khandwa district